The 1940 Santa Clara Broncos football team represented Santa Clara University as an independent during the 1940 college football season. In its fifth season under head coach Buck Shaw, the team compiled a 6–1–1 record, outscored opponents by a total of 155 to 46, and was ranked No. 11 in the final AP Poll.

Schedule

References

Santa Clara
Santa Clara Broncos football seasons
Santa Clara Broncos football